Andrei Fyodorovich Kazusenok (born 15 January 1984) is a Belarusian judoka and sambist.

At the 2008 Summer Olympics he was eliminated in the quarterfinals of the 90 kg competition after losing his fight to Ivan Pershin. In the repechage he lost in the semifinals against the upcoming bronze medalist Hesham Mesbah. In sambo, he won gold at the 2007 and 2008 World Championships.

Achievements

References
 Profile on yahoo
 Profile on ESPN

External links

 
 
 

1984 births
Living people
Belarusian male judoka
Belarusian sambo practitioners
Olympic judoka of Belarus
Judoka at the 2008 Summer Olympics
European Games silver medalists for Belarus
European Games medalists in sambo
Sambo practitioners at the 2015 European Games
Sambo practitioners at the 2019 European Games
People from Babruysk
Sportspeople from Mogilev Region